Chetostoma mundum is a species of tephritid or fruit flies in the genus Chetostoma of the family Tephritidae.

References

mundum